Thamy Caretta Ventorin (born August 27, 1987 in Vitória) is a Brazilian competitive swimmer.

In 2009, she broke the short-course South American record in the 200-metre breaststroke, with a time of 2:28.62.

Integrating Brazilian national delegation that disputed the 2011 Pan American Games in Guadalajara, she won the silver medal in 4×200-metre freestyle by participating at heats. She also finished 12th in the 200-metre breaststroke.

In August 2012, she was hospitalized 18 days due to a respiratory problem that has not been identified, but managed to heal.

References

1987 births
Living people
People from Vitória, Espírito Santo
Brazilian female breaststroke swimmers
Brazilian female freestyle swimmers
Swimmers at the 2011 Pan American Games
Pan American Games silver medalists for Brazil
Pan American Games medalists in swimming
Medalists at the 2011 Pan American Games
Sportspeople from Espírito Santo
21st-century Brazilian women
20th-century Brazilian women